KJDM (101.7 FM) is a radio station licensed to Lindsborg, Kansas, United States. The station is currently owned by Divine Mercy Radio, Inc., and broadcasts a Catholic radio format.

KDJM history
The station was previously owned by Radioactive LLC and operated by Rocking M Media, broadcasting a classic country format under the call sign KDJM. Effective January 16, 2020, KDJM was sold to Divine Mercy Radio for $340,000.

On February 17, 2020, the station changed its call sign to KJDM.

References

External links
 

Radio stations established in 2008
2008 establishments in Kansas
Catholic radio stations
JDM
Lindsborg, Kansas
Catholic Church in Kansas